A credit union, a type of financial institution similar to a commercial bank, is a member-owned nonprofit financial cooperative. Credit unions generally provide services to members similar to retail banks, including deposit accounts, provision of credit, and other financial services. In several African countries, credit unions are commonly referred to as SACCOs (Savings and Credit Co-Operatives).

Worldwide, credit union systems vary significantly in their total assets and average institution asset size, ranging from volunteer operations with a handful of members to institutions with hundreds of thousands of members and assets worth billions of US dollars. In 2018, the number of members in credit unions worldwide was 274 million, with nearly 40 million members having been added since 2016.

Leading up to the financial crisis of 2007–2008, commercial banks engaged in approximately five times more subprime lending relative to credit unions and were two and a half times more likely to fail during the crisis. American credit unions more than doubled lending to small businesses between 2008 and 2016, from $30 billion to $60 billion, while lending to small businesses overall during the same period declined by around $100 billion. In the US, public trust in credit unions stands at 60%, compared to 30% for big banks. Furthermore, small businesses are 80% less likely to be dissatisfied with a credit union than with a big bank.

"Natural-person credit unions" (also called "retail credit unions" or "consumer credit unions") serve individuals, as distinguished from "corporate credit unions", which serve other credit unions.

Differences from other financial institutions 

Credit unions differ from banks and other financial institutions in that those who have accounts in the credit union are its members and owners, and they elect their board of directors in a one-person-one-vote system regardless of their amount invested. Credit unions see themselves as different from mainstream banks, with a mission to be community-oriented and to "serve people, not profit".

Credit unions offer many of the same financial services as banks but often use different terminology. Typical services include share accounts (savings accounts), share draft accounts (cheque accounts), credit cards, share term certificates (certificates of deposit), and online banking. Normally, only a member of a credit union may deposit or borrow money. Surveys of customers at banks and credit unions have consistently shown significantly higher customer satisfaction rates with the quality of service at credit unions. Credit unions have historically claimed to provide superior member service and to be committed to helping members improve their financial situation.  In the context of financial inclusion, credit unions claim to provide a broader range of loan and savings products at a much cheaper cost to their members than do most microfinance institutions.

Credit unions differ from modern microfinance. Particularly, members' control over financial resources is the distinguishing feature between the cooperative model and modern microfinance. The current dominant model of microfinance, whether it is provided by not-for-profit or for-profit institutions, places the control over financial resources and their allocation in the hands of a small number of microfinance providers that benefit from the highly profitable sector.

Not-for-profit status 
In the credit union context, "not-for-profit" must be distinguished from a charity. Credit unions are "not-for-profit" because their purpose is to serve their members rather than to maximize profits, so unlike charities, credit unions do not rely on donations and are financial institutions that must make what is, in economic terms, a small profit (i.e., in non-profit accounting terms, a "surplus") to remain in existence. According to the World Council of Credit Unions (WOCCU), a credit union's revenues (from loans and investments) must exceed its operating expenses and dividends (interest paid on deposits) in order to maintain capital and solvency.

In the United States, credit unions incorporated and operating under a state credit union law are tax-exempt under Section 501(c)(14)(A). Federal credit unions organized and operated in accordance with the Federal Credit Union Act are tax-exempt under Section 501(c)(1).

Global presence 

According to the World Council of Credit Unions (WOCCU), at the end of 2018 there were 85,400 credit unions in 118 countries. Collectively they served 274.2 million members and oversaw US$2.19 trillion in assets. WOCCU does not include data from cooperative banks, so, for example, some countries generally seen as the pioneers of credit unionism, such as Germany, France, the Netherlands and Italy, are not always included in their data. The European Association of Co-operative Banks reported 38 million members in those four countries at the end of 2010.

The countries with the most credit union activity are highly diverse. According to WOCCU, the countries with the greatest number of credit union members were the United States (101 million), India (20 million), Canada (10 million), Brazil (6.0 million), South Korea (5.7 million), Philippines (5.4 million), Kenya and Mexico (5.1 million each), Ecuador (4.8 million), Australia (4.5 million), Thailand (4.1 million), Colombia (3.6 million), and Ireland (3.3 million).

The countries with the highest percentage of credit union members in the economically active population were Barbados (82%), Ireland (75%), Grenada (72%), Trinidad & Tobago (68%), Belize and St. Lucia (67% each), St. Kitts & Nevis (58%), Jamaica (53% each), Antigua and Barbuda (49%), the United States (48%), Ecuador (47%), and Canada (43%). Several African and Latin American countries also had high credit union membership rates, as did Australia and South Korea. The average percentage for all countries considered in the report was 8.2%. Credit unions were launched in Poland in 1992;  there were 2,000 credit union branches there with 2.2 million members. From 1996 to 2016, credit unions in Costa Rica almost tripled their share of the financial market (they grew from 3.7% of the market share to 9.9%), and grew faster than private-sector banks or state-owned banks in Costa Rica, after financial reforms in that country.

History 

"Spolok Gazdovský" (The Association of Administrators or The Association of Farmers) founded in 1845 by Samuel Jurkovič, was the first cooperative in Europe (Credit union). The cooperative provided a cheap loan from funds generated by regular savings for members of the cooperative. Members of cooperative had to commit to a moral life and had to plant two trees in a public place every year. Despite the short duration of its existence, until 1851, it thus formed the basis of the cooperative movement in Slovakia. Slovak national thinker Ľudovít Štúr said about the association: "We would very much like such excellent constitutions to be established throughout our region. They would help to rescue people from evil and misery. A beautiful, great idea, a beautiful excellent constitution!"

Modern credit union history dates from 1852, when Franz Hermann Schulze-Delitzsch consolidated the learning from two pilot projects, one in Eilenburg and the other in Delitzsch in the Kingdom of Saxony into what are generally recognized as the first credit unions in the world. He went on to develop a highly successful urban credit union system. In 1864, Friedrich Wilhelm Raiffeisen founded the first rural credit union in Heddesdorf (now part of Neuwied) in Germany. By the time of Raiffeisen's death in 1888, credit unions had spread to Italy, France, the Netherlands, England, Austria, and other nations.

The first credit union in North America, the Caisse Populaire de Lévis in Quebec, Canada, began operations on 23 January 1901 with a 10-cent deposit. Founder Alphonse Desjardins, a reporter in the Canadian parliament, was moved to take up his mission in 1897 when he learned of a Montrealer who had been ordered by the court to pay nearly Can$5,000 in interest on a loan of $150 from a moneylender. Drawing extensively on European precedents, Desjardins developed a unique parish-based model for Quebec: the caisse populaire.

In the United States, St. Mary's Bank Credit Union of Manchester, New Hampshire, was the first credit union. Assisted by a personal visit from Desjardins, St. Mary's was founded by French-speaking immigrants to Manchester from Quebec on 24 November 1908. Several Little Canadas throughout New England formed similar credit unions, often out of necessity, as Anglo-American banks frequently rejected Franco-American loans. America's Credit Union Museum now occupies the location of the home from which St. Mary's Bank Credit Union first operated. In November 1910 the Woman's Educational and Industrial Union set up the Industrial Credit Union, modeled on the Desjardins credit unions it was the first non-faith-based community credit union serving all people in the greater Boston area. The oldest statewide credit union in the United States was established in 1913. The St. Mary's Bank Credit Union serves any resident of the Commonwealth of Massachusetts.

After being promoted by the Catholic Church in the 1940s to assist the poor in Latin America, credit unions expanded rapidly during the 1950s and 1960s, especially in Bolivia, Costa Rica, the Dominican Republic, Honduras, and Peru. The Regional Confederation of Latin American Credit Unions (COLAC) was formed and with funding by the Inter-American Development Bank credit unions in the regions grew rapidly throughout the 1970s and into the early 1980s. By 1988 COLAC credit unions represented 4 million members across 17 countries with a loan portfolio of circa US$0.5 billion. However, from the late 1970s onwards many Latin American credit unions struggled with inflation, stagnating membership, and serious loan recovery problems. In the 1980s donor agencies such as USAID attempted to rehabilitate Latin American credit unions by providing technical assistance and focusing credit unions' efforts on mobilising deposits from the local population. In 1987, the regional financial crisis caused a run on credit unions. Significant withdrawals and high default rates caused liquidity problems for many credit unions in the region.

Stability and risks
Credit unions and banks in most jurisdictions are legally required to maintain a reserve requirement of assets to liabilities. If a credit union or traditional bank is unable to maintain positive cash flow and/or is forced to declare insolvency, its assets are distributed to creditors (including depositors) in order of seniority according to bankruptcy law. If the total deposits exceed the assets remaining after more senior creditors are paid, all depositors will lose some or all of their initial deposits. However, most jurisdictions have deposit insurance that promises to make depositors whole up to a maximum insurable account level.

Corporate 

Credit unions as such provide service only to individual consumers. Corporate credit unions (also known as central credit unions in Canada) provide service to credit unions, with operational support, funds clearing tasks, and product and service delivery.

Leagues and associations 
Credit unions often form cooperatives among themselves to provide services to members. A credit union service organization (CUSO) is generally a for-profit subsidiary of one or more credit unions formed for this purpose. For example, CO-OP Financial Services, the largest credit-union-owned interbank network in the United States, provides an ATM network and shared branching services to credit unions. Other examples of cooperatives among credit unions include credit counselling services as well as insurance and investment services.

State credit union leagues can partner with outside organizations to promote initiatives for credit unions or customers. For example, the Indiana Credit Union League sponsors an initiative called "Ignite", which is used to encourage innovation in the credit union industry, with the Filene Research Institute.

The Credit Union National Association (CUNA) is a national trade association for both state- and federally chartered credit unions located in the United States. The National Credit Union Foundation is the primary charitable arm of the United States' credit union movement and an affiliate of CUNA.

The National Association of Federally-Insured Credit Unions (NAFCU) is a national trade association for all state and federally-chartered credit unions. Based outside of Washington, D.C., NAFCU's mission is to provide all credit unions with federal advocacy, compliance assistance, and education.

The World Council of Credit Unions (WOCCU) is both a trade association for credit unions worldwide and a development agency. The WOCCU's mission is to "assist its members and potential members to organize, expand, improve and integrate credit unions and related institutions as effective instruments for the economic and social development of all people".

EverythingCU.com is an online community of credit union professionals.

Deposit insurance 
In the United States, federal credit unions are chartered and overseen by the National Credit Union Administration (NCUA), which also provides deposit insurance similar to the manner in which the Federal Deposit Insurance Corporation (FDIC) provides deposit insurance to banks. State-chartered credit unions are overseen by the state's financial regulatory agency and may, but are not required to, obtain deposit insurance. Because of problems with bank failures in the past, no state provides deposit insurance and as such there are two primary sources for depository insurance – the NCUA and American Share Insurance (ASI), a private insurer based in Ohio.

In Canada, the majority of credit unions and caisses populaires are provincially incorporated and deposit insurance is provided by a provincial Crown corporation. For example, in Ontario up to 250,000 of eligible deposits in credit unions are insured by the Financial Services Regulatory Authority of Ontario. Federal credit unions, such as the UNI Financial Cooperation caisse in New Brunswick, are incorporated under federal charters and are members of the Canada Deposit Insurance Corporation.

See also 

 Bond of association
 Consumers' cooperative
 Cooperative banking
 Capital market
 Community federal credit union
 Deposit account
 Democratic member control (cooperatives)
 History of credit unions
 Humanomics
 Labour Bank
 Credit unions in Canada
 Credit unions in the United Kingdom
 Credit unions in the United States

References

Further reading 
 Ian MacPherson. Hands Around the Globe: A History of the International Credit Union Movement and the Role and Development of the World Council of Credit Unions, Inc. Horsdal & Schubart Publishers Ltd, 1999.
 F.W. Raiffeisen. The Credit Unions. Trans. by Konrad Engelmann. The Raiffeisen Printing and Publishing Company, Neuwid on the Rhine, Germany, 1970.
 Fountain, Wendell. The Credit Union World. AuthorHouse, Bloomington, Indiana, 2007.

External links 

 Credit Union National Association national trade association for credit unions
 World Council of Credit Unions global trade association for credit unions
 Association of Asian Confederations of Credit Unions regional federation representing 21 national federations in Asia with 35 million retail members
 National Credit Union Service Organization directory of all credit unions in the U.S.
 National Credit Union Foundation charitable arm of credit union industry

 
Cooperative banking
Social economy
Community building
Financial services